The first round of OFC matches for 2018 FIFA World Cup qualification (and 2016 OFC Nations Cup qualification) was played from 31 August to 4 September 2015 in Tonga.

Format
In this round, four teams, as determined by the OFC in March 2014, played a single round-robin tournament held in a single country which was later decided to be in Tonga. All matches were held at the Loto-Tonga Soka Centre in Nuku'alofa.

Samoa, the winner, advanced to the 2016 OFC Nations Cup, held from 28 May – 12 June 2016, to join the other seven teams which received a bye into the group stage. The winner of the OFC Nations Cup, New Zealand, represented the OFC at the 2017 FIFA Confederations Cup. Moreover, the OFC Nations Cup served as the second round of qualifying for the 2018 FIFA World Cup in Russia, with the top six teams advancing to the third round of FIFA World Cup qualifying.

Participating teams
In April 2014 the OFC announced its executive's decision on the teams to compete in the tournament. The four lowest ranked teams (based on FIFA World Ranking and sporting reasons) among the 11 OFC entrants entered the first round:

Note: Bolded team qualified for the 2016 OFC Nations Cup.

Venue
All matches were held at the Loto-Tonga Soka Centre in Nuku'alofa

Standings

Matches
The match schedule was revealed on 30 July 2015, following a draw held at OFC Headquarters in Auckland, New Zealand. All times are local, UTC+13.

Goalscorers
There were 17 goals scored in 6 matches, for an average of  goals per match.

4 goals

 Taylor Saghabi

2 goals

 Demetrius Beauchamp
 Justin Manao
 Johnny Hall
 Andrew Mobberley

1 goal

 Ryan Aloali'i Mitchell
 Ramin Ott
 Desmond Fa'aiuaso
 Faitalia Hamilton-Pama
 Sione Uhatahi

Notes

References

External links

Qualifiers – Oceania: Round 1, FIFA.com
Stage 1 Qualifiers, oceaniafootball.com

OFC Nations Cup qualifying
Qualifying
1
2016
International association football competitions hosted by Tonga